Rangamati Science and Technology University is a public university located in Rangamati, Bangladesh, commonly known as RMSTU. It has faced vocal opposition from local groups such as Parbatya Chattagram Jana Samhati Samiti (PCJSS) because they believe that students, staff, and faculty would come predominantly from outside the Chittagong Hill Tracts, and their settlement in Rangamati would change the character of the region. The first batch of 75 students began classes in November 2015, at a temporary campus set up at Tabalchharhi Shah High School.

Academics
The university's 5 departments are organised into 4 faculties.

List of Vice-Chancellors 
 Professor Dr. Pradanendu Bikash Chakma (2015–2022)
 Professor Dr. Shelina Akhter (2022- Present)

List of Pro-Vice Chancellor 
 Professor Dr. Kanchan Chakma (2022- Present)

References 

Universities and colleges in Bangladesh
2014 establishments in Bangladesh
Educational institutions established in 2014